The genus Spaziphora are small to medium-sized predatory flies.

Species
S. cincta (Loew, 1863)
S. hydromyzina (Fallén, 1819)
S. tomkovichi Ozerov, 2012

References

Scathophagidae
Schizophora genera
Taxa named by Camillo Rondani